This is a list of singles that charted in the top ten of the Billboard Hot 100, an all-genre singles chart, in 2014.

During the year, 59 songs (including those who peaked in 2013 and 2015 prior to their entry) and 66 acts charted in the tier, and 28 of these acts scored their first top-ten single in the US either as a lead or featured artist. Ariana Grande had the most top tens in 2014, with four, while Pharrell Willams's single "Happy" became the longest-running number one song in the U.S., spending ten consecutive weeks in the countdown; and OneRepublic's "Counting Stars" and Meghan Trainor's "All About That Bass" became the longest top-ten singles of the year, spending twenty-five consecutive weeks in the tier. John Legend's first top ten hit "All of Me" became the third-longest ascent to number one after Los del Rio's hit song "Macarena" and Lonestar's Amazed, reached on its thirtieth week, and spending twenty-three weeks in the top 10.

Top-ten singles
Key
 – indicates single's top 10 entry was also its Hot 100 debut
 – indicates Best performing song of the year
(#) – 2014 year-end top 10 single position and rank

2013 peaks

2015 peaks

Notes

The single re-entered the top ten on the week ending January 11, 2014.
The single re-entered the top ten on the week ending January 18, 2014.
The single re-entered the top ten on the week ending January 25, 2014.
The single re-entered the top ten on the week ending February 22, 2014.
The single re-entered the top ten on the week ending April 5, 2014.
The single re-entered the top ten on the week ending September 13, 2014.
The single re-entered the top ten on the week ending September 20, 2014.
The single re-entered the top ten on the week ending September 27, 2014.
The single re-entered the top ten on the week ending October 4, 2014.
The single re-entered the top ten on the week ending November 15, 2014.
The single re-entered the top ten on the week ending December 6, 2014.
The single re-entered the top ten on the week ending December 20, 2014.

See also
 2014 in American music
 List of Billboard Hot 100 number ones of 2014
 Billboard Year-End Hot 100 singles of 2014

References

External links
Billboard.com
Billboard.biz
The Billboard Hot 100

United States Hot 100 Top Ten Singles
2014